Salle Marcel Cerdan is an indoor sporting arena located in Brest, France.  The capacity of the arena is 2,000 people.  It is currently home to the Étendard de Brest basketball team.

The name literally means "Marcel Cerdan Hall".
 means "hall", i.e., a sports hall, or indoor arena.
Marcel Cerdan was a French boxer. 

In September 2020, the site is in the demolition phase, a residential area will take place on the surface of 1.3 hectares. 

Indoor arenas in France
Basketball venues in France
Buildings and structures in Brest, France
Sports venues in Finistère
Boxing venues in France